S-Town is an American investigative journalism podcast hosted by Brian Reed and created by the producers of Serial and This American Life. All seven chapters were released on March 28, 2017. The podcast was downloaded a record-breaking 10 million times in four days and had been downloaded over 40 million times by May 2017.

Synopsis
In 2012, horologist John B. McLemore sent an email to the staff of the show This American Life asking them to investigate an alleged murder in his hometown of Woodstock, Alabama, a place he claimed to despise. After a year of exchanging emails and several months of conversation with McLemore, producer Brian Reed traveled to Woodstock to investigate. He investigated the crime and eventually found that no such murder took place, though he struck up a friendship with McLemore, a "depressed but colorful" character. He recorded conversations with McLemore and other people in Woodstock, which are played on the podcast.

McLemore killed himself by drinking potassium cyanide on June 22, 2015, while the podcast was still in production. In the narrative of the podcast, this occurs at the end of the second episode, and subsequent episodes deal with the fallout from McLemore's death while exploring more of McLemore's life and character. Though the podcast was promoted under the name S-Town, Reed reveals in the first episode that this is a euphemism for "Shit-Town", McLemore's derogatory term for Woodstock. Reed generally refers to the podcast by the non-euphemized name in the episodes themselves.

People involved

 Brian Reed – host and executive producer
 John B. McLemore – horologist
 Mary Grace McLemore – John's elderly mother
 Tyler Goodson – John's younger friend and employee
 Jake Goodson – John's employee and Tyler's brother
 Kabrahm Burt – rumored to have murdered Dylon Nicols
 Dylon Nicols – purported to have been murdered by Kabrahm
 Allan "Bubba" Cresswell – co-owned a tattoo parlor with Tyler
 Skyler Goodson – Jake's wife
 Allen Bearden – John's friend and a horologist based in Pell City, Alabama
 Reta Lawrence – John's cousin
 Charlie Lawrence – Reta's husband
 Jeff Dodson – mayor of Woodstock and briefly John's business partner
 Cheryl Dodson – John's friend and one time love interest. Worked as Woodstock Town Clerk during John's time of delight with the town and co-owned Woodstock Garden Center with John. Interviewed in Chapter 7.
 Faye Gamble – Woodstock town clerk to whom John spoke on the phone while he committed suicide
 Boozer Downs – The town's and John's attorney.  
 Michael Fuller – A former friend of John's who now lives in New York City and is interviewed in Chapter 5.
 Olin Long – A friend of John's, whom John met on a singles' line for men, in 2003. Almost had a love affair with John, but it was never consummated. Interviewed in Chapter 6.

Episodes
All episodes were released simultaneously on March 28, 2017. The podcast is available to stream or download for free on the official website, iTunes, Stitcher, Radiopublic, or through the RSS feed.

Music
S-Town incorporates various specially composed pieces of music throughout the episodes from composers Daniel Hart, Helado Negro, Trey Pollard, and Matt McGinley, including an S-Town theme produced by Hart. The show's closing music, used at the end of each episode, is "A Rose for Emily" by The Zombies.

Further developments
Shortly after the release of the podcast, John's online obituary was flooded with support and shared reflections from around the world. In an April 2017 interview, Tyler Goodson said that he sometimes regrets "ever speaking into that microphone because [he] was probably upset, or wasn't thinking clearly" since he faced trial for the criminal actions that were described in the podcast. In October 2017, Goodson pleaded guilty to the burglaries that were described in the podcast, and he will serve five years on probation with a ten-year suspended sentence.

Lawsuit
In July 2018, McLemore's estate administrator filed a lawsuit against the S-Towns production company, Serial Productions. The suit, which was filed without the knowledge of McLemore's family, alleged that by selling advertisements with the podcast they violated McLemore's personality rights. In March 2019, a judge declined to dismiss the complaint, leading to depositions, a discovery phase, and mediation. Discovery revealed that McLemore actively participated and cooperated with the podcast. The case was settled in May 2020 and subsequently dismissed.

Reception

S-Town was culturally popular and received mixed critical reviews. The Boston Globe Ty Burr thought the show was complex and voyeuristic. He asked the question "is S-Town a freak show for the NPR crowd?" and described the series as "seven chapters of provocative red herrings that almost but never quite add up to a place, a people, or a man". Jessica Goudeau from The Atlantic questioned the ethics of the series, asking "is it okay to confess another person's pain for the sake of a good story?". Goudeau also wondered how Flannery O'Connor, Robert Lowell, or Elizabeth Bishop would have reacted to the podcast and the exploration of poor, white, rural America. Slate Katy Waldman wrote that S-Town feels more like a new genre, "something more like aural literature". Vox's Aja Romano called the podcast "stunning", but suggested the podcast was too invasive and should not have been made.

The podcast's critics claimed that the studio took advantage of John's death in order to gain publicity. Crixeo, an online arts monthly, argues that Reed did not have the right to publicly out John as queer. At the same time, other views contend that S-Town was a way for them to take the story of John's death and shed light on mental health in the U.S. The Atlantics Spencer Kornhaber praised the series for its journalism, and humanism, as the series "hints at the possibility of cultural reconciliation" within the community. Rebecca Nicholson from The Guardian called the series "a noble attempt at understanding life", as the series showed "the great hope that resides within", by showing a person trying to survive within their surroundings.

The Guardian gave S-Town a critical review. The opinion piece called S-Town "a good story, but an indefensible one." The article states that the podcast is supposed to leave you feeling positive, however instead it feels forced. The author feels that the podcast doesn't fully address the main quandary at the center of S-Town.

By May 2017, the podcast series was downloaded over 40 million times. 
It retained a high ranking in the iTunes chart and continued to be analysed in the press well into 2017. Since then, the podcast remained popular and had been downloaded 77 million times by the anniversary of its release.

 Awards 
S-Town podcast received the Peabody Award for 2017 in the category Radio/Podcast. The show won the Directors' Choice award at the 2017 Third Coast International Audio Festival.George Foster Peabody Award'

 2017 WBEZ/Chicago, IL, S-Town,  "S-Town" breaks new ground for the medium by creating the first audio novel, a non-fiction biography constructed in the style and form of a 7-chapter novel.

See also
List of American crime podcasts

References

External links
 

Investigative journalism
Infotainment
Audio podcasts
2017 podcast debuts
2017 podcast endings
Bibb County, Alabama
American podcasts